The Carnegie Mellon University College of Engineering (formerly known as the Carnegie Institute of Technology) is the academic unit that manages engineering research and education at Carnegie Mellon University. The College can trace its origins from Andrew Carnegie's founding of the Carnegie Technical Schools. Today, The College of Engineering has seven departments of study and is ranked 4th nationally.

History 

By 1905, the massive buildings of the Carnegie Technical Schools were being constructed in a field east of the University of Pittsburgh. The first students of the School of Science and Technology began classes in unfinished buildings, still surrounded by new construction.  The school initially offered two- and three-year programs to train the children of Pittsburgh's working class. After the merger between Carnegie Tech and the Mellon Institute of Industrial Research, the newly formed Carnegie Mellon University's College of Engineering and Science was divided into the Carnegie Institute of Technology (engineering) and the Mellon College of Science. Subsequently, the Carnegie Institute of Technology was re-branded as the College of Engineering.

About the College of Engineering

Enrollment for or the 2017-2018 academic year was 1,783 full-time undergraduate, 1,383 master's, and 703 doctoral students. The college employs 207 faculty members whose research is recognized and supported by such sources as the National Science Foundation, the National Institutes of Health, Defense Advanced Research Projects Agency, and the Environmental Protection Agency. As part of Carnegie Mellon University, the College of Engineering works to carry out the university's mission of “changing the needs of society by building on its traditions of innovation, problem-solving and interdisciplinarity”.

The College's Office of the Dean is housed in Scaife Hall, and the college's primary facilities include Hamerschlag Hall, Roberts Engineering Hall, Doherty Hall, and Scott Hall, in addition to Scaife.

Engineering and Public Policy
"Engineering and Public Policy", informally known as "EPP", is an interdisciplinary academic department within the Carnegie Mellon College of Engineering. EPP combines technical analysis with social science and policy analysis, in order to address problems in which knowledge of technical details is critical to decision making. The primary purpose of the E&PA program was to train undergraduate engineering students to work at the interface of the social and engineering sciences, through use of an interdisciplinary curriculum based equally on social analysis and engineering analysis. Students received a Bachelor of Science degree from one of the traditional engineering departments plus E&PA.

EPP works in a variety of research areas on problems that involve the interaction of technology with society.  These include:

 Energy and environment (including climate);
 Risk analysis and communication;
 Information and communication technology policy;
 Management of technical innovation and R&D policy.

Across these four focal areas, the department addresses issues in technology and organizations, and in technology and economic development, focusing in particular on India and China. EPP also develops new software tools for the support of policy analysis and research, and studies issues in engineered systems and security.

References

External links
Carnegie Mellon University College of Engineering official website
Carnegie Mellon Nanofabrication Facility

Schools and departments of Carnegie Mellon
Engineering universities and colleges in Pennsylvania
Educational institutions established in 1900
Andrew Carnegie
Pittsburgh History & Landmarks Foundation Historic Landmarks
1900 establishments in Pennsylvania